Charles de Gaulle Plaza is a "class A" office building in the Charles de Gaulle Square, Bucharest, Romania. It is constructed entirely out of concrete, steel and glass. There are an additional five floors underground that serve as a parking space with 350 places.

See also
List of tallest buildings in Romania

References

External links

Official site

Skyscraper office buildings in Bucharest
Office buildings completed in 2005